Arkansas Highway 211 (AR 211 and Hwy. 211) is a north–south state highway in Clay County, Arkansas. The route of  runs from US 62/US 67 (Future I-57) near Datto north through Success to the Missouri state line.

Route description
AR 211 begins at US 62/US 67 (Future I-57) north of Datto. AR 211 runs north to Success, when the route serves as the northern terminus of AR 328. The route meets Missouri supplemental route E at the Missouri state line, where the route terminates.

Major intersections

See also

 List of state highways in Arkansas

References

External links

211
Transportation in Clay County, Arkansas